Poor Moon is an American band.

Poor Moon may also refer to:

 Poor Moon (Hiss Golden Messenger album)
 Poor Moon (Poor Moon album)
 "Poor Moon", song by Canned Heat